In New France and in modern Missouri, a King's Ball is a celebration held on Epiphany (La fête des rois), or some later time before Lent.

The tradition was brought to the New World by Catholic émigrés. The parties lasted throughout the night and into the next day, when a late morning breakfast was served. Music, dancing and fine food were always important elements of the event. But the centerpiece of the annual celebration was the selection of the royal personage.

As in other European Epiphany celebrations, a Galette des Rois was baked, with a bean hidden in it. The man who found the bean in his slice was crowned King of the festivities; he selected his Queen, and they reigned over the year's festivities. More recently, a small Christ child trinket has been substituted for the bean.

References

 This article had a note reading: Article edited from the Ste. Genevieve Herald newspaper, but with no date or page.

External links
 Article: USA Today Travel, Jan 3rd, 2008
 St. Louis's Annual King's Ball webpage

Balls in the United States
French-Canadian culture in Missouri
French-American culture in Missouri
Missouri culture
Catholic culture